Highway 165 is a provincial gravel highway in the Canadian province of Saskatchewan. It runs from Highway 155 to Highway 106. Highway 165 runs west to east parallel to the boundary of the Pre-Cambrian shield in northern Saskatchewan. The highway skirts around the southern shores of Pinehouse Lake and Lac la Ronge (lake).
Highway 165 passes near the communities of Sakamayack and Beauval. Several provincial recreation sites are accessible from Highway 165. Highway 165 has a  concurrency with Highway 2.

Major intersections 
From west to east. The entire route is in the Northern Saskatchewan Administration District and Division No. 18.

See also 
Roads in Saskatchewan
Transportation in Saskatchewan

References 

165